The Trials of Henry Kissinger is a 2002 documentary film directed by Eugene Jarecki and narrated by Brian Cox. Inspired by Christopher Hitchens' 2001 book The Trial of Henry Kissinger, the film examines war crimes alleged to have been perpetrated by Henry Kissinger, the National Security Advisor and later Secretary of State under Presidents Nixon and Ford.

Reception
Review aggregator Rotten Tomatoes collected 58 reviews, of which 95% were positive. Metacritic gave the film a score of 72/100 based on 23 critics.

References

External links
 The Trials of Henry Kissinger at Internet Movie Database
 The Trials of Henry Kissinger at Rotten Tomatoes
 The Trials of Henry Kissinger at FreeDocumentaries.org

2002 documentary films
2002 films
American documentary films
Documentary films about American politicians
Documentary films about war
Documentary films alleging war crimes
Films based on non-fiction books
Films directed by Eugene Jarecki
Henry Kissinger
2000s English-language films
2000s American films